Strongylognathus destefanii is a species of ant in the genus Strongylognathus. It is endemic to Italy.

References

Hymenoptera of Europe
Strongylognathus
Insects described in 1915
Endemic fauna of Italy
Taxonomy articles created by Polbot